Ray "M" Franklin (7 May 1934 – 11 June 2017) was a major general in the United States Marine Corps who served as commanding general of the Marine Corps Research, Development and Acquisition Command.

References

1934 births
2017 deaths
United States Marine Corps generals